The 2011 Franklin American Mortgage Music City Bowl, the 14th edition of the game, was a post-season American college football bowl game, held on December 30, 2011, at LP Field in Nashville, Tennessee as part of the 2011–12 NCAA Bowl season.

The game, which began telecast at 6:40 p.m. ET on ESPN, featured the Mississippi State Bulldogs from the Southeastern Conference versus the Wake Forest Demon Deacons from the Atlantic Coast Conference. Mississippi State won, 23–17, securing its fifth bowl win in a row and its second in two seasons.

References

2011–12 NCAA football bowl games
2011
2011
2011
2011 in sports in Tennessee
December 2011 sports events in the United States